Dirk de Vries Lam (20 January 1869, Leeuwarden – 5 July 1937, Groningen) was a Dutch painter who specialized in cityscapes. The name De Vries, from his mother's side of the family, was added, by official permission, in 1897.

Life and work 
He was the son of Herman Lam, a pharmacist, and his wife, Willempje née De Vries-Reilingh. He received his first drawing lessons at the Hogere Burgerschool in Leeuwarden. He then moved to Amsterdam, where he studied at the School of Applied Arts from 1888 to 1891. This was followed by advanced studies at the Rijksakademie, with August Allebé and Pierre Cuypers. Upon graduating, he was awarded certificates in drawing and engineering. 

In 1895, he took a position as an art teacher at the Burgerschool in Enkhuizen. He also worked in Monnickendam, Volendam and Hoorn. In 1900, he married Sara Jacoba Maria de Gavere (1872-1953).

He received a major promotion in 1903; becoming Director of the Academie Minerva in Groningen. In that position, he increased the number of classes devoted to the practical and applied arts; adding courses on lithography, batik, and upholstery. He also ensured that his students learned how to paint directly from nature, rather than by copying existing works. In 1905, he added architecture to the curriculum. The Academie was incorporated as a Secondary Technical School in 1913.

He stayed there until 1934. Many of them would later belong to the artists' collective known as "De Ploeg".

Sources 
 Francis van Dijk, Leraren van de Academie Minerva : een keuze uit twee eeuwen kunstonderwijs in Groningen, H.J.W. Drijvers (Ed.). B & P, Groningen, 1998. pg.128 
 G. Knuttel jr, "D. de Vries Lam", Elsevier’s Geïllustreerd Maandschrift, #49 Vol.97, 1939/1

External links

 "Gezinskaart van Dirk de Vries Lam (1869-1937)" @ Greets Genealogie

1869 births
1937 deaths
Dutch painters
Dutch landscape painters
Cityscape artists
People from Leeuwarden